Herron Airport  is a privately owned airport in New Cumberland, West Virginia, United States, part of the Pittsburgh Combined Statistical Area.  It was opened in November 1946, founded by Earle Herron.

References

External links 
 

Airports in West Virginia
Transportation in Hancock County, West Virginia
Buildings and structures in Hancock County, West Virginia
Privately owned airports